Latiano is a comune in the province of Brindisi in Apulia, on the southeast coast of Italy. Its main economic activities are tourism and the growing of olives and grapes.

Bartolo Longo was a native of Latiano.

Main sights
Castle, or Palazzo Imperiali, built in the 12th century, but rebuilt several times until the current 18th-century appearance
Mother Church or Santa Maria della Neve, restored in Baroque style in 1778.
Solise Tower
Museo del Sottosuolo (Museum of the Underground), founded in 1973

Twin towns
 Pompei, Italy, since 1980

References

Cities and towns in Apulia
Localities of Salento